Tak Aghaj may refer to:
 Tak Aghaj, West Azerbaijan
 Tak Aghaj, Zanjan